Dorothy Miner may refer to:
Dorothy Miner (attorney) (1936-2008), American lawyer
Dorothy Miner (historian) (1904-1973), American art historian